Walter Kondratovich (April 5, 1924 – August 13, 1987) was an American football player and coach. He served as the head football coach at the University of Bridgeport in Bridgeport, Connecticut from 1949 to 1959. Kondratovich was a three-sport athlete at Warren Harding High School in Bridgeport.  He was the starting quarterback at Columbia University in the mid-1940s under coach Lou Little.

References

External links
 

1924 births
1987 deaths
American football quarterbacks
Bridgeport Purple Knights football coaches
Columbia Lions football players
Sportspeople from Bridgeport, Connecticut
Players of American football from Connecticut
Warren Harding High School alumni